Tagore (the anglicised form of the Bengali title Thakur) is the name of a prominent Bengali family of intellectuals, writers and artists, and most often refers to:
 Rabindranath Tagore (1861–1941), Bengali poet, writer, composer, philosopher, social reformer and painter
 Tagore family

Tagore may also refer to:

Jorasanko branch of the Tagore family 

 Abanindranath Tagore (1871–1951), artist
 Debendranath Tagore (1817–1905), Brahmoism founder
 Dwarkanath Tagore (1794–1846), businessman and aristocrat
 Dwijendranath Tagore (1840–1926), writer, musician, and pioneer in Bengali shorthand and musical notations
 Gaganendranath Tagore (1867–1938), artist
 Ganendranath Tagore (1841–1869), musician and founder of Jorasanko Natyashala
 Hemendranath Tagore (1844–1884), nationalist, yogi, founder of Adi Dharm
 Jyotirindranath Tagore (1849–1925), musician
 Rabindranath Tagore (1861–1941), writer, performer, the first Asian to win the Nobel Prize in 1913. Composed the Indian and  Bangladeshi national anthems
 Ramanath Tagore (1801–1877), social figure associated with British Indian Association
 Satyendranath Tagore (1842–1923), musician, reformer, and the first Indian to join the ICS in 1863
 Swarnakumari Devi (1855–1932), female novelist

Pathuriaghata branch of the Tagore family 

 Gnanendramohan Tagore (1826–1890), first Asian to be called to the English bar in 1862
 Gopimohan Tagore (1760–1819), one of the founders of Hindu College
 Jatindramohan Tagore (1831–1908), philanthropist
 Prasanna Coomar Tagore (1801–1886), lawyer
 Prodyot Coomar Tagore (1873–1942), former Sheriff of Calcutta
 Sourindramohan Tagore (1840–1914), founder of the Banga Sangeet Vidyalaya and the Bengal Academy of Music
 Sharmila Tagore (b. 1944), film actor

Instutitutions/ Organisations etc. linked to the Tagores 
 Adi Dharm, a religion
 Brahmo Samaj, the societal component of the Brahmo religion 
 Jorasanko, a neighbourhood in north Kolkata, West Bengal, India.
 Jorasanko Thakur Bari, (Bengali: House of the Thakurs) in Jorasanko, north of Kolkata, West Bengal, India.
 Pathuriaghata, a neighbourhood in north Kolkata, West Bengal, India.
 Rabindra Bharati University, a university in Kolkata, Wst Bengal, India.
 Rabindra Nritya Natya, dramas composed by Rabindranath Tagore
 Rabindra Sangeet, songs composed by Rabindranath Tagore
 Vangiya Sahitya Parishad, a literary society in Bengal, India.
 Visva-Bharati University, a university in Santiniketan, West Bengal, India.

Other uses 
 Tagore (film), a 2003 Tollywood film starring Chiranjeevi

Bengali Hindu surnames